Tomáš Suchánek (born 7 April 1984 in Pardubice, Czechoslovakia) is a motorcycle speedway rider who first rode in the UK for the King's Lynn Stars in the Premier League in 2003. 

Suchánek is a Czech international, representing them in the Speedway World Cup in 2005 and 2006. 

In 2008 he signed for the Reading Racers.

References 

1984 births
Living people
Czech speedway riders
King's Lynn Stars riders
Isle of Wight Islanders riders
Poole Pirates riders
Redcar Bears riders
Somerset Rebels riders
Wolverhampton Wolves riders
Mildenhall Fen Tigers riders
Reading Racers riders
Sportspeople from Pardubice